A mop is an impletment for mopping floors

MOP, mop or MoP may refer to:

Computer science
 Maintenance Operations Protocol, in computer networks
 Metaobject protocol, a technique that allows a computer programmer to extend or alter the semantics of a language

Government and organizations
 Macanese pataca, the currency of Macau, by ISO 4217 code
 Ministry of Public Works (Chile)
 United Nations Messengers of Peace
 Messengers of Peace (Scouting)

Places
 Manila Ocean Park, an aquarium in the Philippines
 Mount Pleasant Municipal Airport (Michigan) (IATA: MOP), in Mount Pleasant, Michigan

Science
 mu opioid peptide (MOP) receptor, also referred to as mu Opioid receptor
 MOP Flippase, Multidrug/Oligosaccharidyl-lipid/Polysaccharide (MOP) Flippase superfamily of transport proteins
 Muriate of potash, see potassium chloride
 Mathematical Olympiad Program, held at Carnegie Mellon University to train team members for the International Mathematical Olympiad

Sports
 Major Opportunity Point, tennis terminology used to describe the point 0-30
 Most Outstanding Player, see also Most Valuable Player
 NCAA basketball tournament Most Outstanding Player in the NCAA basketball tournaments
 List of NCAA Division I Ice Hockey Tournament Most Outstanding Player in NCAA ice hockey tournaments

Other
 Manual of Practice, or Project Resource Manual, published by the Construction Speficiations Institute
 M.O.P., or Mash Out Posse, an American rap duo
 Mother of pearl
 Museum of Printing, a collection and library dedicated to the history and culture of printing and graphic arts
 A type of paintbrush

See also
 
 Mop & the Dropouts, a 1980s Australian band led by Mop Conlon
 MOPP (disambiguation)
 Mops (disambiguation)